Conover is an unincorporated community located in the town of Conover, Vilas County, Wisconsin, United States. Conover has a post office with ZIP code 54519.

History
A post office called Conover has been in operation since 1894. The community was named for Seth H. Conover, a local hotel owner.

References

Unincorporated communities in Vilas County, Wisconsin
Unincorporated communities in Wisconsin